In the education system in England and Wales, science at GCSE level is studied through Biology, Chemistry and Physics.

Double Award
Combined Science results in two GCSEs. Those with GCSEs in Combined Science can progress to A Levels in all of the three natural science subjects. Prior to this, around 1996, Combined Science GCSEs were available as an alternative to three separate Sciences for many exam boards.

Combined Science consists of either  Higher Tier (HT) or Foundation Tier (FT) papers

AQA offer two different specifications entitled Synergy and Trilogy.

Triple Award
Triple Award Science, commonly referred to as Triple Science, results in three separate GCSEs in Biology, Chemistry and Physics and provide the broadest coverage of the main three science subjects.

The qualifications are offered by the four main awarding bodies in the England; AQA, Edexcel, OCR, CIE and Eduqas.

History 
In August 2018, Ofqual announced that it had intervened to adjust the GCSE Science grade boundaries for students who had taken the "higher tier" paper in its new double award science exams and performed poorly, due to an excessive number of students in danger of receiving a grade of "U" or "unclassified".

Criticisms 
In 2020, Teach First published a report stating that only two female scientists, chemist and crystallographer Rosalind Franklin and paleoanthropologist Mary Leakey, were included in the GCSE Science curriculum, versus 40 male scientists who were named. The report argued that the lack of female role models in the science curriculum was perpetuating gender biases in the profession.

References

Educational qualifications in the United Kingdom
Science education in the United Kingdom